A New Day, released in 2001, is the fourth album by reggae singer Luciano. In the March 23, 2001, issue of The Washington Post, music reviewer Richard Harrington wrote about the album, "There's even a bit of peppy dancehall, but the main approach is uplift, fueled by the rhythm section of Sly & Robbie, the Firehouse Crew and the harmony vocals of the Daffodils."

CD information
Catalog #: VP1617

Track listing
 No Night In Zion
 Oh Father I Love Thee
 Is there A Place
 Happy People
 Road Of Life
 Nah Give Up
 God Is My Friend
 Only A Fool
 Traveler
 African Skies
 A New Day
 Hardcore
 Spring Summer
 God & King
 Tell Me Why?
 Save The World (Acoustic Version)
 Journey

References

2001 albums
Luciano (singer) albums